Pennington is an unincorporated community in Houston and Trinity Counties in the U.S. state of Texas. Originally known as Tyler or Tyler's Prairie, Pennington is located off U.S. Highway 287 near the Davy Crockett National Forest. Although it is unincorporated, It has a post office with a zip code of 75856.

History 
Pennington was founded by Jose Martin Predo, AF Westall, and Daniel Dailey in 1835 on a land grant  By 1859, Dailey was the sole owner of the land grant. In 1866, Dailey began to plot out the land grant, what is today Pennington, then solely in Trinity County, named after Hill Pennington, the town's first merchant. The post office opened in 1883. The peak of the town was around this time, as it was the county seat, with a population over 1,500, but the seat was moved to nearby Groveton, because Pennington had no railroad, which lead to its decline in 1882. Pennington was briefly an incorporated town in 1901, but unincorporated in 1904. From then to now, Pennington became a quiet farm town, although, unlike most rural towns that decline, Pennington still has a post office. By the 1990s, a small portion of Pennington extended to Houston County.  Its population was 67 as of 2000.

Education
The Groveton Independent School District serves students on both the Houston and Trinity County sides of the community.

References

External links

Gallery

Unincorporated communities in Texas
Unincorporated communities in Houston County, Texas
Unincorporated communities in Trinity County, Texas